Thomas "Tommy" H. Harris (birth unknown – death unknown) was an English rugby union, and professional rugby league footballer who played in the 1910s and 1920s.

Playing career

International honours
Tommy Harris won a cap for England (RL) while at Rochdale Hornets in 1924 against Other Nationalities.

County honours
Tommy Harris represented Cornwall (RU) while at Redruth RFC.

Challenge Cup Final appearances
Tommy Harris played left-, i.e. number 8, in Rochdale Hornets' 10–9 victory over Hull F.C. in the 1922 Challenge Cup Final during the 1921–22 season at Headingley Rugby Stadium, Leeds on Saturday 6 May 1922, in front of a crowd of 32,596.

Challenge Cup Final appearances
Tommy Harris transferred from Redruth R.F.C. to Rochdale Hornets on 30 November 1920, his signing bonus (signing-on/sign-on fee) is unknown.

Note
Tommy Harris' first initial is stated as J. on englandrl.co.uk, and rugbyleagueproject.org.

References

External links

Cornish rugby union players
England national rugby league team players
English rugby league players
English rugby union players
Place of birth missing
Place of death missing
Rochdale Hornets players
Rugby league players from Cornwall
Rugby league props
Rugby union forwards
Rugby union players from Cornwall
Year of birth missing
Year of death missing